Radmanović is a surname. Notable people with the surname include:

Davor Radmanović (born 1957), Croatian footballer and manager
Nebojša Radmanović (born 1949), Bosnia and Herzegovina politician
Staniša Radmanović (born 1940), Yugoslav sprint canoeist
Vladimir Radmanović (born 1980), Serbian basketball player

Serbian surnames